Farquar Lake is a lake in Dakota County, in the U.S. state of Minnesota. It was most likely named for John Farquhar, a pioneer settler, although it may have been named for James Farquhar, whose name appears on the abstract of land entries in 1874 as the owner of property adjacent to it.

See also
List of lakes in Minnesota

References

Lakes of Minnesota
Lakes of Dakota County, Minnesota